There are more than 3,000 named lakes, reservoirs, and dry lakes in the U.S. state of California.

Largest lakes

In terms of area covered, the largest lake in California is the Salton Sea, a lake formed in 1905 which is now saline.

In terms of volume, the largest lake on the list is Lake Tahoe, located on the California–Nevada border.

Many of California's large lakes are actually reservoirs:  artificial bodies of fresh water. In terms of both area and volume, the largest of these is Lake Shasta, which formed behind Shasta Dam in the 1940s.

List 
The list is alphabetized by the name of the lake, with the words lake, of, and the ignored.  To sort on a different column, click on the arrows in the header row.

Geographic coordinates, approximate elevations, alternative names, and other details may be obtained by following the Geographic Names Information System links in the third column.
 
Note: Lakes grow and shrink due to precipitation, evaporation, releases, and diversions.
For this reason, many of the surface areas tabulated below are very approximate.  
For reservoirs, the areas at maximum water storage are indicated.  Reservoirs used for flood control are seldom allowed to reach maximum storage.

See also

Geography of California
List of dams and reservoirs in California
List of lakes in Lake County, California
List of lakes in the San Francisco Bay Area
List of lakes in the United States
List of largest reservoirs of California
List of rivers of California
Water in California

References

External links

Alphabetical Index of California Reservoirs 

Lakes
California